Lodha is a town and block in Aligarh district of Uttar Pradesh state, India. Lodha Block Head Quarters is the city of Lodha. It belongs to Aligarh division.

References 

Cities and towns in Aligarh district
Villages in Aligarh district